The rescue of Leningrad Jewish children in Beslenei occurred in August, 1942, in aul of Beslenei, Cherkess Autonomous Oblast, Russian SFSR, USSR, when the local Circassian villagers adopted evacuated children from Leningrad orphanage, the most of whom were Jewish, and managed to forge documents with the purpose to prove Nazis that the children are of local descent. 

The orphanage, placed on the Malaya Okhta was evacuated in April, 1942 to Armavir by the Road of Life on the Ladoga's ice. However, in August German offensive reached Caucasus, and it was decided to evacuate the orphanage to Abkhazia via Teberda and Caucasus Range. 

When carts with weakened children entered Beslenei, 40 km west from Cherkessk, the locals, fearing that the children could not survive the transfer via the range, offered to adopt them, especially whom other villagers avoided to adopt due to possible punishment by the Nazis, i.e. Jews.

The local selsoviet chairman Sagid Shovgenov and kolkhoz chairman Khusin Lakhov arranged a meeting, where they decided to adopt 36 children and distribute food reserves among the adoptive parents. They also forged all documents in the village, referring to the adoptive families, as well as all documents of the children. 

Soon, the Germans broke the front and occupied the territory. They met the evacuating orphanage in Teberda and massacred them. They got to know, that some of children stayed in Beslenei and managed to reveal them. However, due to the forgery of all documents and activity of the village elder Murzabek Okhtov, who agreed to be appointed by the Nazis in the purpose to save the children, nobody was discovered. Okhtov managed to convince local German administration, that the denunciations, reporting about children were false. During the five month occupation only one teenager was lost, as he was accused in encroachment of the German soldier's life.

After the Germans retreated, Okhtov was accused in collaboration by the Soviet authority. However, after two weeks of investigation he was liberated.

The majority of children were sent to Stalingrad orphanage, however some of them stayed in Beslenei.

References
  , 
  

History of Karachay-Cherkessia
Beslenei